The 2013 season of the Cook Islands Round Cup is the fortieth recorded season of top flight association football competition in the Cook Islands, with any results between 1951 and 1969 and also in 1986 and 1988–1990 currently unknown.

League table

Results

References

Cook Islands Round Cup seasons
Cook
football